Cheslie Corrinne Kryst (April 28, 1991 – January 30, 2022) was an American attorney, television correspondent, model, and beauty pageant titleholder who was crowned Miss USA 2019. Kryst was also an attorney and had served as a correspondent for Extra from October 2019 until her death. For her work on Extra, she was nominated for two Daytime Emmy Awards.

Early life and education
Cheslie Corrinne Kryst was born on April 28, 1991 in Jackson, Michigan to an African-American mother and a Polish-American father. She had four brothers: Asa, Chandler, Jet, and Brooklyn; and a sister, Page. Her mother, April Simpkins, competed in pageantry and was crowned Mrs. North Carolina US when Kryst was a child. The family moved from Michigan to Charlotte, North Carolina, when Kryst was young, and later settled in Rock Hill, South Carolina, where Kryst attended Northwestern High School. The family later moved to Fort Mill, South Carolina, and Kryst transferred to Fort Mill High School, graduating in 2009; both cities are suburbs in the Charlotte metropolitan area.

After graduating from high school, Kryst moved to Columbia, South Carolina, to attend the Honors College at the University of South Carolina. She graduated cum laude from the Darla Moore School of Business with a degree in marketing and human resource management in 2013, where she was also a member of the Alpha Lambda Delta honor society, Gamecocks women's track and field team, and mock trial.

After finishing her undergraduate degree, Kryst enrolled in Wake Forest University School of Law in Winston-Salem, North Carolina, graduating with a Juris Doctor and Master of Business Administration in 2017.

Law career
Following her graduation, Kryst became licensed to practice law in both North Carolina and South Carolina and began working as an attorney at Poyner Spruill LLP, practicing complex civil litigation. She also worked pro bono not only for clients who were low-level drug offenders, but also with Brittany K. Barnett of the Buried Alive Project, to free a client sentenced to life imprisonment. She was the founder of the fashion blog White Collar Glam, dedicated to helping women dress professionally in white-collar jobs.

Pageantry
Kryst began her pageantry career as a teenager, winning Miss Freshman at Northwestern High School in Rock Hill, South Carolina, and later Miss Fort Mill High School in Fort Mill, South Carolina. After taking several years off from pageantry, Kryst made two attempts to win the Miss North Carolina title, placing in the top ten her first attempt and first runner-up on her second attempt.

Miss USA 2019
In 2016, Kryst competed in Miss North Carolina USA 2017, where she placed as the fourth runner-up to Katie Coble. She returned the following year and placed in the top ten, before returning again for Miss North Carolina USA 2019, where she won the title, representing Metrolina. She was crowned by Kaaviya Sambasivam, Miss North Carolina Teen USA 2018, as the outgoing titleholder Caelynn Miller-Keyes was unable to attend the crowning due to the filming of season 23 of The Bachelor.

As Miss North Carolina USA, Kryst was given the right to represent North Carolina at the Miss USA 2019 competition, held at the Grand Sierra Resort in Reno, Nevada. She went on to win the competition and became the third woman from North Carolina to win the title, following Chelsea Cooley and Kristen Dalton, who were crowned Miss USA 2005 and Miss USA 2009, respectively. At 28 years and 4 days old, Kryst became the oldest woman to be crowned Miss USA, breaking the previous record held by Nana Meriwether, who was 27 years, 6 months and 26 days old upon assuming the title, until R'Bonney Gabriel surpassed her. After winning Miss USA, Kryst crowned Laura Little as her successor for the Miss North Carolina USA title.

With her win, 2019 became the first year that all four major United States-based pageants were won by women with African ancestry; other titleholders were Zozibini Tunzi of South Africa (as Miss Universe 2019), Nia Franklin (as Miss America 2019), and Kaliegh Garris (as Miss Teen USA 2019). Previously, she had been crowned Miss North Carolina USA 2019.

As Miss USA, Kryst took a one-year leave of absence from her law career to fulfill her pageantry duties. She represented the United States at the Miss Universe 2019 competition on December 8, 2019 and finished in the top ten. Her national costume was inspired by four American female icons: Rosie the Riveter, the Statue of Liberty, Maya Angelou, and Lady Justice. Kryst's reign was originally scheduled to end on spring 2020, but due to the COVID-19 pandemic, she became the longest reigning Miss USA titleholder on June 5, 2020, surpassing Nia Sanchez's previous record of 399 days. Her reign ended with a total of 557 days on November 9, 2020 and she crowned Asya Branch of Mississippi as her successor at the Miss USA 2020 pageant.

Television hosting
In October 2019, Kryst became a New York City correspondent for Extra, after serving as a special correspondent in September 2019. Her interview with actor Terrence Howard was the first to break the news that the actor planned to retire from acting following the final season of the television series Empire.

In 2020, Kryst received a nomination for Outstanding Entertainment News Program at the 47th Daytime Emmy Awards due to her position as a New York correspondent for Extra. She was nominated again for the same award the following year at the 48th Daytime Emmy Awards.

Death
On January 30, 2022, Kryst jumped to her death from 350 West 42nd Street, a 60-story high-rise apartment building in Midtown Manhattan, where she resided and was last seen on the 29th floor. On January 31, her death was ruled a suicide by the coroner. Kryst's mother April Simpkins released a statement, where she stated that Kryst had "high-functioning depression".

Explanatory notes

References

External links

 

1991 births
2022 deaths
2022 suicides
21st-century African-American women
21st-century American women
African-American beauty pageant winners
African-American bloggers
African-American lawyers
African-American television hosts
African-American women lawyers
African-American women writers
American beauty pageant winners
American bloggers
American people of Polish descent
American television hosts
American women television presenters
American women bloggers
Beauty pageant contestants from North Carolina
Female suicides
Lawyers from Charlotte, North Carolina
South Carolina lawyers
Miss North Carolina USA winners
Miss Universe 2019 contestants
Miss USA winners
People from Jackson, Michigan
People from Fort Mill, South Carolina
People from Rock Hill, South Carolina
South Carolina Gamecocks women's track and field athletes
Suicides by jumping in New York City
University of South Carolina alumni
Wake Forest University alumni
Wake Forest University School of Law alumni